James Hall may refer to:

Entertainment
 James Norman Hall (1887–1951), American novelist
 James Hall (actor) (1900–1940), American actor
 James Baker Hall (1935–2009), American poet and professor
 James W. Hall (born 1947), American novelist in Florida
 James A. Hall (born 1947), music professor at the University of South Carolina
 James Hall (singer) (born 1968), American rock singer and guitarist
 James Hall (musician) (born 1971), American gospel musician

Politics
 Sir James Hall, 4th Baronet (1761–1832), Scottish politician and geologist
 James Hall (governor) (1802–1889), founder of Maryland-in-Africa
 James Hall (Canadian politician) (1806–1882), Canadian Member of Parliament
 J. H. Hall (1877–1942), British MP for Whitechapel and St Georges
 James Knox Polk Hall (1844–1915), American politician

Sports

Cricket
 James Hall (Cambridgeshire cricketer), English first-class cricketer
 Jamie Hall (born 1968), English cricketer
 James Hall (Irish cricketer) (born 1988), English-born Irish cricketer

Rugby
 James Hall (rugby league) (1922–2011), Australian rugby player
 James Hall (rugby union, born 1986), English rugby union player
 James Hall (rugby union, born 1996), South African rugby union player

Other sports
 James Hall (athlete) (1903–1929), Indian sprinter
 James M. Hall (active 1936–37), Scottish footballer
 James Hall (American football) (born 1977), American football defensive end
 James Hall (sport shooter) (born 1983), American sport shooter
 James Hall (footballer) (born 1989), Filipino-Scottish footballer 
 James Hall (gymnast) (born 1995), English gymnast
 Blainey Hall (James Blaine Hall, 1889–1975), American baseball player
 Seaman Nobby Hall (James Hall, 1892–1953), British boxer

Science and academia
Sir James Hall, 4th Baronet (1761–1832), Scottish geologist and politician
 James Hall (paleontologist) (1811–1898), American geologist and paleontologist
 James Hall (historian) (1846–1914), English historian and antiquarian
 James O. Hall (1912–2007), amateur historian and Abraham Lincoln scholar
 James Hall (philosopher) (born 1933), American philosophy professor at University of Richmond

Other 
James Hall (architect), of Evans, Bruer, & Hall, designers of the Piccadilly Cinema in Adelaide, Australia
James Hall (explorer) (died 1612), English explorer
James Hall (minister) (1744–1826), Presbyterian minister in Iredell County, North Carolina
James Hall (writer) (1793–1868), American judge and editor
James Goodwin Hall (1896–1952), American business executive
James Hall III (born 1958), American soldier and East-bloc spy
James Randal Hall (born 1958), U.S. federal judge
James R. Hall, United States Army officer

See also
 Jim Hall (disambiguation)
 Stuart Hall (presenter) (born 1929), English former media personality